Julian Norris Goater (born 12 January 1953) is a male retired British long-distance runner.

Athletics career
Goater grew up in Mill Hill, London NW7, and began his running career while attending The Haberdashers' Aske's Boys' School, Elstree, where his father Barry (1930-2022) was a Biology master. In 1979 he was a member of the team that took the gold medal at IAAF World Cross Country Championships. He was also in the team that won the silver medal in World Cross Country Championships in 1982. In 1981 he was the National Cross Country champion and finished 4th in IAAF WCCC. He set the second fastest 5000m time for a Briton (behind Brendan Foster) when he ran a time of 13:15.59 in 1981 at Crystal Palace, London. His best time for the 10,000 m is 27:34.58 which was achieved in Oslo in 1982 and is still in the UK top 10 of best ever times.

He represented England and won a bronze medal in the 10,000 metres event, at the 1982 Commonwealth Games in Brisbane, Queensland, Australia.

Triathlon and Duathlon
Goater took up triathlon and duathlon in the 1990s competing at National and International Age-Group levels. During the late 1990s he joined Team Volcano International, run by Chris Eversfield and Iain Parsons, competing for the TVI Team Volcano team over a number of seasons. Goater achieved a gold medal at the World Duathon Championships (2001) in Rimini, picking up another gold in Australia in 2005. He remains an active coach, athlete and author. He is now living in Surrey and visits schools around Bracknell to give talks to children.

References

gbrathletics

1953 births
Living people
English male long-distance runners
Duathletes
British male triathletes
English male triathletes
Commonwealth Games bronze medallists for England
Commonwealth Games medallists in athletics
Athletes (track and field) at the 1982 Commonwealth Games
World Athletics Championships athletes for Great Britain
Universiade medalists in athletics (track and field)
People educated at Haberdashers' Boys' School
Universiade bronze medalists for Great Britain
Medalists at the 1975 Summer Universiade
Medallists at the 1982 Commonwealth Games